Burning Bridges is the third studio album by Swedish melodic death metal band Arch Enemy. It is the first Arch Enemy album to feature Sharlee D'Angelo on bass and the last studio recording to feature vocalist Johan Liiva.  The music here showcases the band's wide interpretation of the death metal genre to include portions of melodic death metal, progressive metal and grindcore. A music video was released for the song "The Immortal".

The album was reissued on 25 May 2009. Featuring original vocalist Johan Liiva, the reissue has a new layout, remastered sound, packaging and bonus tracks. It also contains original artwork, liner notes by Johan Liiva and a track-by-track commentary by guitarist Michael Amott.

Reception

Burning Bridges was well received by critics. Steve Huey of AllMusic praised the album, writing: "... having honed a potent blend of classic-style death metal, melodic twin-guitar leads à la the new wave of British heavy metal, touches of prog metal and of grindcore courtesy of later Carcass or Napalm Death, and just plain solid riff writing. Burning Bridges, their third effort, consolidates the gains made on its predecessor Stigmata, establishing Arch Enemy as a dependable force and one of the better bands working death metal territory as the '90s drew to a close." Nathan Robinson of Metal Rules was surprised at the amount of fast material, although there are no blast beats, and praised the singer Johan Liiva stating that he "offers more variety this time, moving between his classic guttural belches to higher, blackened screeches. He truly delivers an impressive vocal performance!" He later highlights the songs "Silverwing", "The Immortal" and "Seed of Hate". Archaic Magazines Ron Salden also praised Liiva's vocals and the production. Salden states that "they took the best of their first 2 albums and Burning Bridges is the amazing result!"

Sean Palmerston of Exclaim! writes that "the eight tracks contained within stand-up quite nicely with recent releases from The Haunted and Witchery as some of the best Swedish metal in recent times." Paul Schwarz of Chronicles of Chaos praised the songs highlighting "Pilgrim". He wrote: "What I love most, though, is the way Arch Enemy slip between the two different feels. "Pilgrim" begins with a hugely melodic, very heavy metal, lead/harmony part, but when Johan Liiva's crushing vocals enter, so does a heavy, percussive, death metal sounding verse riff, then, when the chorus comes in, the two opposites are expertly combined together." Critics Ron Salden and Paul Schwarz stated that "this album will surely be one of the best releases in this year if not the best!" and that Arch Enemy "managed to pool their considerable talents and emerge with one of the year's best albums", respectively.

Track listing

Personnel
Personnel credits adapted from the album's liner notes.

Arch Enemy
 Johan Liiva − vocals
 Michael Amott − guitars, production
 Christopher Amott − guitars
 Sharlee D'Angelo − bass
 Daniel Erlandsson − drums

Production
 Fredrik Nordström − producer, engineer, keyboards
 Per Wiberg – Mellotron and grand piano on "Burning Bridges"
 Göran Finnberg – mastering
 Ulf Horbelt – re-mastering
 Anna Sofi Dahlberg – artwork, photography, layouts
 Tony Hunter – band photography
 Adde – band photography on page 16
 Media Logistics GmbH – additional layout
 Philipp Schulte – product coordination

References

External links
 Burning Bridges at Encyclopaedia Metallum
 Burning Bridges at Discogs

1999 albums
Arch Enemy albums
Albums produced by Fredrik Nordström
Albums recorded at Studio Fredman
Century Media Records albums